Mulla Powinda or Mullah Powindah, born Mohiuddin Maseed (1863–1913), was a religious leader and a freedom fighter from the Pashtun tribe of the Shabi khel Mahsuds, based in Waziristan. He was from Marobi Shabikhel, a village in the present-day Makin Subdivision of South Waziristan, Pakistan. He led a long-standing guerrilla insurgency against the British forces in the late 19th century. And came to prominence by getting the two elders of the Jirga , who were responsible for handing over two  Mahsuds wanted by the British authorities for killing a British officer of the Works department. to the Political Agent in 1893.

Mullah Powindah used the Tochi Valley of North Waziristan as his centre of operations and incited people from the area to revolt in Jihad against the British. He became known first as the Selani Mulla and later as Mulla Powinda rather than by his rarely used real name of Mohiuddin. In his later years i.e the first of decade of nineteenth-century he was also called as "Shahninshah-i-Taliban" He was not a scholar in real terms but was familiar with the main tenets of Islam, and due to his closeness with the clergy came to be known as a Mullah. He was a revolutionary National leader and even the staunchest and most unwilling Wazir and Mahsud tribesmen supported him and united on his call.

Mulla Powinda did Bai'ath from Mulla Muhammad Anwar of Tirah under the Qadiriyyah Tariqa. His teacher was Maulana Hamzullah Wazir who also was a prominent mujahed of his time. Along with religious teachings, Mulla Powinda also received military training from Maulana Hamzullah Wazir.

Clash with the British

The British did not like his increasing popularity. They were already aware of the resistance from the Wazirs. In 1894, 2,000 Mahsud youths had raided the British Cantonment, of the Durand Force and the mastermind of the  raid, was this Mullah Pawinda and the field commander of the Lashkar was an Abdur Rahman Khel Mahsud named Jaggar British losses at the hand of these Mujahideen in Wana were still fresh in their minds. After this incident, a Mr. Bruce was named the Political Agent to the South Waziristan agency. He had already played a major role in the success of the Sandeman policy in Balochistan.

However, Bruce knew it would be difficult to handle the tribes. Unlike Balochistan; where sardars wield the power, whereas in the Mahsud and Wazir tribes had power in the Jirga; where every single youth was an important member. As soon as Bruce was appointed, a group of five Wazirs assassinated the British officer in charge of the constructions and communications department. Bruce pressured the Maliks to bring forward the accused in a Jirga and punish them. The Mahsud tribe yielded under pressure and brought forward the five accused. They were each given seven years imprisonment.

When Mulla Powindah learned of this, he understood it as an act of submitting to the authority of the British. He announced that no one was to carry out this punishment. At this, the public surrounded the abodes of each of the Maliks who had announced the punishment. Three of them were executed for treason and the other two vanished fearing their lives. Along with this, Mulla Powinda also sent a letter to the political agent Mr. Brucc through his trusted nephew Mulla Abdul Hakeem. In the letter, he told the Political Agent to release the five tribesmen. At the time of receiving the letter. Mr. Bruce was again planning to recapture areas outside Wana. In the same letter Mulla Powinda also told him to stay clear of Wana.

As expected, Bruce did not pay much attention to these warnings and sent an insulting reply to Mulla Powinda. After the failure of these peace talks, Mulla Powinda decided to inflict a sudden strike on the British to convince them to take him seriously.

Early morning on 2 November 1894, the British officers were still asleep in the Wana cantonment. Suddenly, a Lashkar of Mahsud aroe wrMujahideen organized by Mullah Powinda made a surprise attack. Such was the ferocity and quickness of the strike that the British forces couldn't make proper decisions on how to react.

According to the Pioneer (published from Allahabad, India), the number of Mujahideen was around 1000. Caroe gives the figure of 2000 while describing the detail of the event, how the drumming, shouting and firing Mujahideen caught the British by surprise. The article reported at least 100 British officers and soldiers killed and moran 200 wounded Masuds also suffered 350 casualties during their withdrawal to their area because Wana lies in Wazir area.

Almost immediately, another army was assembled, its command given to Sir William Lockhart, and then sent to Waziristan. By November, cantonments in Waziristan were filled with troops under the British.

General Lockhart gave the Mullas and other leaders a time frame of one month in which to submit an apology. But throughout the time nobody said anything or did anything.

On 14 December, the army spread out hoping to encounter the rebels and teach them a lesson. They proceeded from Wana to Kaniguram, Jandola to Makeen and from Bannu to Razmak. Winter had started and snow began to fall. Ice cold winds started to blow. The soldiers who had come from hot areas of India to these highlands were not used to the cold.

The Wazirs and Mahsuds played a patient waiting game. They did not confront the incoming armies, but followed the time-honored strategy of almost all Pashtun tribes which allows their enemies in and then unleash a fierce counterattack. However, in this case the British faced no resistance. On 9 January the British forces retreated back to the same positions from which they had started.

On 21 January 1895 the British approached the tribesmen for peace talks and proposed the following demands:
 The Tribesmen return all the loot and war booty
 Mulla Powinda not be allowed to enter any area of Waziristan
 50 Rifles, 200 Guns, 2 Swords and 1200 Rupees be given to the British as a fine for the crimes they have committed

During negotiations, the tribesmen agreed to the demands but none of them was ever fulfilled.
 He publicly refused the usual allowance given to a tribal leader by the colonial government, insisting that his tribe's concerns be addressed. Caroe admits in his book that they could never buy this man and he refused all offers. The British Political Agent and later Resident in his famous book on Mahsuds "Miz" writes "Given more malleable material to work upon than Masuds have ever afforded and fortunate setting in time and space, he might well have ranked with many who have been accounted as great men"  Caroe in his book pays very rich tributes to the man, by saying; "Had the Mahsuds been possessed with manners and decorum of yousafzais, under such leader they might have laid the foundation of a state as stable as Swat, under the Mianguls" ({ as quoted by Gandapur, in Unsung Pushtoons, P-115 & 122})

1900-1902 war 
Following a punitive expedition in 1900-02, the Mahsud had signed a peace agreement with the British authorities, bringing conflict to an end for the time being.

Death 
Mulla died in November 1913, and was succeeded as chieftain by his second surviving son, Fazl-Din, who was 14 or 15 years of age at this time.

See also
 Mirzali Khan
 Sartor Faqir
 Umra Khan

References

External links
 Waziristan-The Past overview of Pakistan's (and by extension the world's) newest trouble spot.

Pashtun people
People from South Waziristan
1863 births
1913 deaths